Tyler Hoover (born January 28, 1990) is an American football tackle who is currently a free agent. He attended Michigan State University and signed with the Colts as an undrafted free agent in 2014.

High school & college
Hoover attended Novi High School in his hometown of Novi, Michigan. He mostly played defensive end, but also saw time at offensive tackle, recording 109 tackles, 8.0 sacks, 5 forced fumbles, and 3 passes defensed as a senior. Hoover also played basketball for his high school, where he lettered for three years and was named the Kensington Valley Conference Defensive Player of the Year as a junior. He then attended Michigan State University, where he played in 48 games (including 23 starts) and made 93 tackles, 9 tackles for loss, 7.5 sacks, 6 passes defensed, 3 forced fumbles, and 1 fumble recovery over 4 years. Hoover graduated with a degree in studio art.

Professional career
Hoover signed as an undrafted free agent with the Indianapolis Colts on May 13, 2014. He was waived by the team on August 30, and signed to the practice squad on September 1. However, the following day he was released from the practice squad, and signed with the Philadelphia Eagles on September 9. On September 30, Hoover was released from the Eagles' practice squad. On December 17, the Colts signed him to their practice squad. On January 19, 2015, Hoover signed a reserve/future contract with the Colts.

References

1990 births
Living people
Players of American football from Michigan
People from Novi, Michigan
American football offensive tackles
Michigan State Spartans football players
Indianapolis Colts players